Partial may refer to:

Mathematics
Partial derivative, derivative with respect to one of several variables of a function, with the other variables held constant
 ∂, a symbol that can denote a partial derivative, sometimes pronounced "partial dee"
Partial differential equation, a differential equation that contains unknown multivariable functions and their partial derivatives

Other uses
Partial application, in computer science the process of fixing a number of arguments to a function, producing another function
Partial charge or net atomic charge, in chemistry a charge value that is not an integer or whole number
Partial fingerprint, impression of human fingers used in criminology or forensic science
Partial seizure or focal seizure, a seizure that initially affects only one hemisphere of the brain
 Partial or Part score, in contract bridge a trick score less than 100, as well as other meanings
 Partial or Partial wave, one sound wave of which a complex tone is composed in a harmonic series  
 Showing partiality, favor, or bias

Arts and entertainment 
Partial (music)
Partial (website)

See also
 Part (disambiguation)
 
Partial function in mathematics, a function for some subset of a total function
Partially ordered set in mathematics, an ordering, sequencing, or arrangement of the elements of a set